The Deep Fork National Wildlife Refuge (DFNWR) is part of the United States system of National Wildlife Refuges, and is a critical resource for wildfowl that migrate along the Central Flyway in Spring and Fall. It is located in Eastern Oklahoma, near the city of Okmulgee. According to TravelOK, DFNWR receives about 45,000 visitors every year.

Description
The refuge was established in June 1993 and dedicated in February 1995. Additional land will be purchased from willing sellers as funds are available, and until the refuge reaches its legal limit in size.

The refugee is a narrow ribbon of wetlands, oxbow lakes, swamps, and upland forests along the meandering Deep Fork River.  More than 80 percent of the refuge floods annually, thus providing excellent habitat for waterfowl and a wide variety of other animals, including white-tailed deer, bald eagles, and wild turkey.  254 species of birds and 51 species of mammals have been recorded in the refuge. Four wildlife species of special concern abound here (the river otter, Bell’s vireo, alligator snapping turtle, and the northern scarlet snake).  Beavers are so numerous as to be considered pests, as are feral hogs.

Most of the vegetation in the refuge is bottomland forests of oak, pecan, elm, hickory, ash, sugarberry, walnut, riverbirch, and willow. The area has been logged in the past and most of the forest is still relatively young, although a few patches of mature forests can be found. New hardwood growth sprouts near the river, then spreads more widely in the refuge when the floods come.

Recreation

Most of the refuge is open to the public year-round. Several parking areas scattered around the refuge give access to visitors for bird watching, hunting, fishing, hiking, and boating. A fishing area is maintained on Montezuma Creek. Near the headquarters the Cussetah Bottoms Boardwalk leads through forests, swamps, and beaver ponds for about one-half mile. In the southernmost part of the refuge a trail through forests follows an old railroad grade, thus elevating it above the frequently-flooded land. Deer, rabbits, squirrel, turkey, and ducks can also be hunted. The Deep Fork River is noted for large Flathead catfish and also has other species. Kayaking is popular in the refuge. Off-road vehicles are prohibited.

Deep Fork River runs for  through the OWMA, which is mostly upland and hilly rather than flat and swampy, as the refuge is. Adjoining the refuge on the south is the Eufaula Wildlife Management area which preserves another  of the Deep Fork River to its mouth at Eufaula Lake. Land in Eufaula WMA is similar in character to the refuge.

References

External links
Deep Fork NWR
Encyclopedia of Oklahoma History and Culture - Deep Fork National Wildlife Refuge

National Wildlife Refuges in Oklahoma
Protected areas of Okmulgee County, Oklahoma
Protected areas established in 1993
Wetlands of Oklahoma
Landforms of Okmulgee County, Oklahoma